The 2012–13 Liberty Flames basketball team represented Liberty University during the 2012–13 NCAA Division I men's basketball season. The Flames, led by fourth year head coach Dale Layer, played their home games at the Vines Center and were members of the North Division of the Big South Conference. Despite losing their first eight games of the season and ending up with a 15–20 record (6–10 in the Big South), Liberty won the Big South tournament to earn an automatic bid to the NCAA Tournament. The Flames were the first 20-loss team in the NCAA Tournament since Coppin State in 2007–08 and only the second 20-loss team ever to qualify. They lost in the first four round to North Carolina A&T to finish the season 15–21.

Roster

Schedule

|-
!colspan=9| Regular season

|-
!colspan=9| 2013 Big South Conference men's basketball tournament

|-
!colspan=9| 2013 NCAA tournament

References

Liberty Flames basketball seasons
Liberty
Liberty
Liberty Fl
Liberty Fl